Wolf Creek Falls, is a two tier waterfall located on the west skirt of the Umpqua National Forest, in Douglas County, in the U.S. state of Oregon. It is located in a privileged area where rivers of the forest create several waterfalls: Cavitt Creek Falls, and Shadow Falls are within five miles of Wolf Creek Falls. Grotto Falls is further to the east off Little River Road and National Forest Road 2703.

Trail 
Wolf Creek Falls totals  fall in two wide cascades and is the centerpiece attraction of the Wolf Creek Falls trailhead and Recreation Site. A foot trail loops out and back for a total of approximately  starting near Glide, Oregon. The first mile of the trail is wheelchair accessible with view points of the dense conifer forests.

See also 
 List of waterfalls in Oregon

References

External links 

Waterfalls of Oregon
Parks in Douglas County, Oregon
Waterfalls of Douglas County, Oregon